The Olimpik Baku 2008–09 season was Olimpik Baku's fourth Azerbaijan Premier League season and their third season with Asgar Abdullayev as manager. They participated in the 2008–09 Azerbaijan Premier League as well as the 2008–09 Azerbaijan Cup, finishing the league in 6th place, being knocked out of the Cup at the Quarterfinal stage by Gabala and going out of the UEFA Cup at the 1st Qualifying Round stage after defeat to Vojvodina.

Squad

Transfers

Summer

In:

Out:

Winter

In:

 

Out:

Competitions

Azerbaijan Premier League

Results

Table

Azerbaijan Cup

UEFA Cup

Qualifying rounds

Squad statistics

Appearances and goals

|-
|colspan="14"|Players who appeared for Olimpik Baku and left during the season:

|}

Goal scorers

Disciplinary record

Notes
Qarabağ have played their home games at the Tofiq Bahramov Stadium since 1993 due to the ongoing situation in Quzanlı.
On 31 October 2008, FK NBC Salyan changed their name to FK Mughan.

References

External links 
 AZAL PFC Official Web Site
 AZAL PFC  at PFL.AZ
 AZAL PFC Official Facebook Page

AZAL PFC seasons
AZAL